Wenns is a municipality in the Imst district 7.30 km south of Imst at the Pitze river. Due to its central location in the Pitztal valley it is one of the area's key villages. The primary source of income is tourism, especially skiing even though there is no skiing in Wenns itself. The 700-year-old Stamserhaus in Wenns is the oldest farmhouse in Tyrol.

Population

References

External links
 https://www.pitztal.com/en/region/places/wenns

Cities and towns in Imst District